Cameron Hall may refer to:

 Cameron Hall (arena), a multi-purpose arena used primarily for basketball in Lexington, Virginia
 Cameron Hall (actor) (1897–1983), British actor
 Cameron Hall (basketball player) (born 1957), Canadian basketball player
 Lester del Rey (1915–1993), American author and editor who sometimes used the pseudonym "Cameron Hall"

Hall, Cameron